Press is a surname with two unrelated origins. In England and Wales, it derives from Priest or Price. In Eastern Europe (especially centered around Minsk), it is a Jewish name, likely derived from the Sephardic surname Peres (Perez, Peretz, Perutz). It also is a metonymic occupational surname that refers to the occupation of someone who ironed clothes, derived from the Yiddish "pres" or flat iron. 

People with the surname include:

 Andrea L. Press (born 1955), American sociologist
 Ben Press (1924–2016), American tennis player, coach and writer
 Bill Press (born 1940), American talk radio host
 Christen Press (born 1988), American soccer player
 Evan Press (born 2000), Welsh footballer
 Fiona Press, Australian actress
 Frank Press (1924–2020), American geophysicist
 Irina Press (1939–2004), Soviet multi-sport track and field athlete
 J. Press (fl. 1910), American clothier founder
 Jim Press (born 1947), American automobile executive
 Jürgen Press (born 1965), German football manager
 Karen Press (born 1956), South African poet
 Malcolm Press (born 1958), British ecologist and professor
 Mikhail Press (1871–1938), Russian-American violinist and conductor
 Moses Alexandrovich Press (1861–1901), Russian engineer
 Natalie Press (born 1980), English actress
 Nigel Press (born 1949), British geologist who pioneered the development of commercial applications of satellite earth observation technology
 Robin Press (born 1994), Swedish ice hockey player
 Sara L. Press (born 1974), American book artist
 Steve Press (born 1946), American politician
 Tamara Press (1937–2021), Soviet shot putter and discus thrower, sister of Irina Press
 Toby Orenstein née Press (born 1937), American theatrical director, producer, and educator 
 William J. Press (fl. 1908), British wrestler
 William H. Press (born 1948), American astrophysicist
 Yeshayahu Press (1874–1955), Israeli scientist

See also
Peretz
Perutz
Perez
Peres
Price

References